The 1955 Baltimore Orioles season involved the Orioles finishing 7th in the American League with a record of 57 wins and 97 losses, 39 games behind the AL champion New York Yankees. The team was managed by first-year manager Paul Richards and played their home games at Baltimore's Memorial Stadium.

Offseason 
In the fall of 1954, the Orioles further distanced themselves from their Browns past by making a 17-player trade with the New York Yankees that included most former Browns of note still on the Baltimore roster. Indeed, to this day the Orioles make almost no mention of their past as the Browns. Though the deal did little to improve the short-term competitiveness of the club, it helped establish a fresh identity for the Oriole franchise.

The details of the trade were as follows: Don Larsen, Billy Hunter, Bob Turley, and players to be named later were traded by the Orioles to the New York Yankees for Gene Woodling, Harry Byrd, Jim McDonald, Hal Smith, Gus Triandos, Willy Miranda and players to be named later. The deal was completed on December 1, when the Yankees sent Bill Miller, Kal Segrist, Don Leppert, and Ted Del Guercio (minors) to the Orioles, and the Orioles sent Mike Blyzka, Darrell Johnson, Jim Fridley, and Dick Kryhoski to the Yankees.

Unlike other clubs that transferred in the 1950s, retaining their nickname and a sense of continuity with their past (such as the Brooklyn-Los Angeles Dodgers and New York-San Francisco Giants), the St. Louis Browns were renamed upon their transfer, implicitly distancing themselves at least somewhat from their history.

Other notable transactions 
 December 6, 1954: Bob Chakales, Jim Brideweser and Clint Courtney were traded by the Orioles to the Chicago White Sox for Don Ferrarese, Don Johnson, Matt Batts, and Fred Marsh.
 December 13, 1954: Harry Schwegeman (minors), Johnny Jancse (minors) and $50,000 were traded by the Orioles to the Brooklyn Dodgers for Billy Cox and Preacher Roe.

Regular season

Season standings

Record vs. opponents

Notable transactions 
 June 15, 1955: Billy Cox and Gene Woodling were traded by the Orioles to the Cleveland Indians for Dave Pope and Wally Westlake. Billy Cox refused to report to his new team. The Baltimore Orioles sent $15,000 to the Cleveland Indians as compensation.
 July 2, 1955: Dave Philley was selected off waivers by the Orioles from the Cleveland Indians.
 July 9, 1955: Wally Westlake was released by the Orioles.
 July 30, 1955: Jim McDonald was traded by the Orioles to the New York Yankees for Ed Lopat.

Roster

Player stats

Batting

Starters by position 
Note: Pos = Position; G = Games played; AB = At bats; H = Hits; Avg. = Batting average; HR = Home runs; RBI = Runs batted in

Other batters 
Note: G = Games played; AB = At bats; H = Hits; Avg. = Batting average; HR = Home runs; RBI = Runs batted in

Pitching

Starting pitchers 
Note: G = Games pitched; IP = Innings pitched; W = Wins; L = Losses; ERA = Earned run average; SO = Strikeouts

Other pitchers 
Note: G = Games pitched; IP = Innings pitched; W = Wins; L = Losses; ERA = Earned run average; SO = Strikeouts

Relief pitchers 
Note: G = Games pitched; W = Wins; L = Losses; SV = Saves; ERA = Earned run average; SO = Strikeouts

Awards and honors 

All-Star Game
 Jim Wilson, reserve

Farm system 

Pine Bluff franchise transferred to Meridian and renamed, June 16, 1955

Notes

References 

1955 Baltimore Orioles team page at Baseball Reference
1955 Baltimore Orioles season at baseball-almanac.com

Baltimore Orioles seasons
Baltimore Orioles season
Baltimore Orio